West Berlin is a community in the Canadian province of Nova Scotia, located in the Region of Queens Municipality .

See also
East Berlin, Nova Scotia

References
West Berlin on Destination Nova Scotia

External links

Communities in the Region of Queens Municipality
General Service Areas in Nova Scotia